Episcopal Church of the Nativity is a historic Episcopal church located at Church and Pinckney Streets in Union, Union County, South Carolina. Construction was started in 1855, but was interrupted by the American Civil War and completed shortly thereafter. The building is a stone Gothic Revival-style church and features a Tiffany stained glass chancel triplet window. Hiram Powers, an American sculptor, carved the octagonal white Carrara marble font that stands in the nave of the church.

It was added to the National Register of Historic Places in 1974.

References

Episcopal churches in South Carolina
Churches on the National Register of Historic Places in South Carolina
Gothic Revival church buildings in South Carolina
Churches completed in 1855
19th-century Episcopal church buildings
Churches in Union County, South Carolina
National Register of Historic Places in Union County, South Carolina